The Accossato was a motorcycle manufactured at Moncalieri, Italy between 1976 and 1990. Bikes were powered by 49cc, 79cc and 124cc Minarelli engines and were built for enduro, trials and motocross riders.

See also 

List of Italian companies
List of motorcycle manufacturers

References

External links
 Ozebook.com: Accossato 80cc motocross bike (image)

Defunct manufacturing companies of Italy
Vehicle manufacturing companies established in 1976
Manufacturing companies disestablished in 1999
Italian brands
Defunct motorcycle manufacturers of Italy
Italian  companies established in 1976 
Italian  companies established in 1999